The women's football tournament at the 2019 Southeast Asian Games was the eleventh women's SEA Games football tournament. The tournament was held in Philippines from 26 November to 8 December 2019 where six teams participated. There were no age restrictions on women's teams.

Vietnam won the tournament for the sixth time, successfully defending their title in the 2017 Southeast Asian Games, thus becoming the most successful team since women's football was added to SEA Games in 1985.

Competition schedule
The following is the competition schedule for the women's football competitions:

Venues
The matches were played at the Biñan Football Stadium in Biñan, Laguna and the Rizal Memorial Stadium in Manila.

Draw
The draw was held on 15 October 2019 at the Sofitel Hotel in Manila. Host Philippines and defending champions, Vietnam were seeded in the Pot 1, Thailand and Myanmar in Pot 2 and Malaysia and Indonesia in Pot 3.

Squads

Group stage 
All times are Philippine Standard Time (UTC+8).

Group A

Group B

Knockout stage

Semi-finals

Bronze medal match

Gold medal match

Winners

Goalscorers

Final ranking

See also
Men's tournament

References

External links
  

Women's tournament
2019 in women's association football